Queenstown is a planning area and satellite residential town situated on the south-westernmost fringe of the Central Region of Singapore. It borders Bukit Timah to the north, Tanglin to the northeast, Bukit Merah to the east and southeast, as well as Clementi to the northwest and west. Its southern and southwesternmost limits are bounded by the Pandan Strait.

Developed by the Singapore Improvement Trust in the 1950s and subsequently by the Housing and Development Board in the 1960s, Queenstown was the first satellite town to be built in the country. Most apartments within the township consists of simple one, two, or three-room flats, typically in low-rise, walk-up blocks. Major development work was carried out during the first Five-Year Building Programme between 1960 and 1965.  A total of 19,372 dwelling units were constructed between 1952 and 1968.

The headquarters of Grab, Razer and the Asia-Pacific Economic Cooperation (APEC) are located in Queenstown.

Etymology
Queenstown was named after Queen Elizabeth II to mark Her Majesty’s coronation in 1953. The area was previously known by the Mandarin Chinese name Wu-wei-gang (Wade Giles: Wu-wei-kang), or in Hokkien as Boh Beh Kang. The arterial road Queensway was officially named in 1954.

History
Previously, the area which Queenstown currently occupies was a large swampy valley with a channel running through in a southeastern direction. On either side of this agricultural area were hills – feng xing and feng ling. The former was a rubber plantation and the latter, a cemetery also known as boh beh kang. The village in the area, with mainly Hokkien and Teochew-speaking dwellers was also the area was inhabited by hundreds of people in attap-roofed huts, cultivating vegetables, growing fruits and rearing pigs and chickens. Buller Camp, a British military camp, was also set up there until 1953 when it was cleared for the new housing estate.

During World War II, Pasir Panjang Ridge became a battleground during the Japanese Invasion of Singapore, where a fierce battle was fought between the defending Malay Regiment and the Japanese troops in February 1942. Despite its valiant efforts to defend Bukit Chandu (Opium Hill in Malay), a key strategic defence position, the Malay Regiment was eventually defeated as it was greatly outnumbered. In 2002, a war museum was opened in Bukit Chandu to commemorate the Battle of Pasir Panjang.

In 1947, the Housing Committee of Singapore highlighted the problem of inadequate housing in Singapore. The report proposed the decentralisation of the population away from the city with the building of self-contained residential areas in the suburbs. This proposal was believed to be an influence of the New town movements in post-war Britain.

The area was subsequently chosen by Singapore Improvement Trust (SIT) as a site for housing development due to its proximity to the successful first public housing scheme in Tiong Bahru. Plans for the development of the area were first announced to the general public on 27 September 1953, with construction of Queenstown's first estate, Princess Margaret Estate (named after HM Elizabeth II's younger sister) having already begun last in July last year. By late 1953, a preliminary batch of 3-room flats was ready for occupation. By 1956, work on the Princess Margaret Estate (later shortened to Princess Estate) had more than 1,000 flats comprising one, two and three-room units and 68 terrace houses. A ceremony was held in October that year for Forfar House, a 14-storey block which was a prominent landmark in those days as it was the tallest HDB flat at that point of time.

The area continued to develop as a self-contained community. Some of the facilities and amenities developed included the Town Centre and the Swimming and Sports Complex. The former was fully completed in 1969 with three cinemas and a variety of outlets including an emporium, a fresh food market, a maternity and child health centre, a bowling alley and a nightclub cum restaurant. The swimming complex was completed in August 1970.

In the 1970s, the success of the new town led to the development of Buona Vista and Holland Village, using the older neighbourhoods of Queenstown as a model. However, by the 1980s, the area had become a mature estate with a higher proportion of senior citizens residing in the area than elsewhere, and a gradual migration of the younger generation into other HDB new towns.

Geography

Queenstown is bounded by the Ulu Pandan Canal, Ghim Moh Housing Estate and the former Tanglin Camp area to the north, Alexandra Road to the east, Clementi Road to the west and the sea to the south. It covers an area of approximately 2,188 ha. The total population (1990 census) is 126,071 with 31,131 housing units. It consists of 16 subzones, namely Ghim Moh, Holland Drive, Commonwealth, Tanglin Halt, Margaret Drive, Mei Chin, Queensway, Portsdown, Buona Vista, Singapore Polytechnic, Dover, National University, Kent Ridge, Pasir Panjang, Pasir Panjang II, and the Port.

Pasir Panjang lies to the south of Queenstown (Pasir Panjang in Malay means "long sandy beach"). The coastline was dotted with Malay villages, the main economic activities being fishing and small-scale agriculture.  Only after the war, did the development of the area begin, with bungalows along the coastline being built in the 1950s. Today, Pasir Panjang is a popular recreational area for sea sports and attractions such as the Haw Par Villa.

Main housing estates

The main housing areas within Queenstown include:
 Princess Estate is the first subdistrict of the Queenstown District consists of several precincts like Strathmore and Dawson. It is also the first rebuilt estate under SERS.
 Duchess Estate is the second subdistrict of Queenstown district which consists of Queenstown Centre and Margaret Drive. Several blocks of 2-storey and 3-storey flats are located in this area. It is also the second rebuilt estate under SERS.
 Tanglin Halt consists of rows of ten storey flats. The remaining HDB flats at Tanglin Halt will be demolished by 2021. It is also the third rebuilt estate under SERS.
 Commonwealth Estate is located near Commonwealth MRT station and consists of precincts like Commonwealth Close and Commonwealth Crescent. It is best known for having a fantastic view of Singapore's Downtown. It is also the fourth rebuilt estate under SERS, to be demolished together with Tanglin Halt.
 Queen's Close is a cluster of flats bounded by Mei Ling district, Portsdown Road and Alexandra Road. Queen's Crescent is now demolished and redevelopment will only begin in 2021.
 Mei Ling/Mei Chin is built from the excavation of two hills, Hong Lim and Hong Yin Hill which are used for cemetery purposes. It is also where Queenstown district got its name Boh Beh Kang, or a river with no source.
 Buona Vista is the last district built in Queenstown. However, it has developed a distinct and unique identity today that is commonly not linked with Queenstown.
 Dover is a small neighbourhood located in the south of Buona Vista. It is also commonly not associated with Queenstown despite being under its planning area. Dover is known to have many schools around its neighbourhood and National University of Singapore and Singapore Polytechnic is also located in this region.
 Ghim Moh is an estate located beside Buona Vista known for its attractive food. It consists of 28 blocks.

Forfar Heights
Forfar House, or Block 39, was built in 1956 by the Singapore Improvement Trust (SIT) as a 14-storey block (which at that time was the tallest residential building in Singapore, holding the record until the building of a 20-story block at Selegie in 1963).  Also known as Chap Si Lao, it was an early part of the mixed height development of the area.  The new blocks at Forfar Heights are featured with blue glazing and blue floodlights at the roofline, reminiscent of the early days, where many units were characterised by the blue glass in their windows, by which the district was acquired its Hokkien name Lam Po Lay.

Block 39, Forfar Square, had 106 three-room-flats, four shops, and an eating house, until it was demolished in the early 2000s together with the surrounding SIT blocks under the Selective en bloc Redevelopment Scheme (SERS).  Currently, the new Forfar Heights consists of two 40-storey blocks (Blk 48, 52) and three 30-storey blocks (Blk 49–51).  Residency was offered to residents from the old Forfar House and Blocks 6A & 6B Margaret Drive in 1996, and residents from Block 172–175 Stirling Road & Block 96 Margaret Drive in 2001.  The new blocks were launched on Tree Planting Day 2005 and SERS Completion Ceremony on 6 November 2005 with guest of honour,  Minister Mentor Lee Kuan Yew and Member of Parliament for Tanjong Pagar GRC.

The name for Forfar Heights had its origin from Forfar Square, which like most Queenstown street names, was connected to the British Royal Family. The name Forfar comes from The Royal Burgh of Forfar, a Scottish town near the childhood home of Queen Elizabeth the Queen Mother.

Demographics
Being the first satellite HDB town in Singapore, Queenstown has one of the highest proportions of elderly aged 65 and above. Many of the residents live in smaller 2-room and 3-room flats. As a result, Queenstown earned its reputation as an "elderly town"

Further developments in Dawson located in Princess Estate have attracted many young Singaporeans to this area in the 2000s as part of the urban renewal efforts. It was announced in 2006 that Margaret Drive will be developed into a modern district with amenities.

Due to the comparatively longer heritage of Queenstown district, local community has flourished. Various online communities such as MyQueenstown have been introduced by the local, independent parts of the district. This has certainly changed the image of the district.

Transportation

Mass Rapid Transit 
There are 9 Mass Rapid Transit stations that serve the planning area, across 2 lines, the East West Line and the Circle Line. Both lines have an interchange station at Buona Vista station. The 9 stations are:

 Queenstown
 Commonwealth
 Buona Vista
 Dover
 Holland Village
 one-north
 Kent Ridge
 Haw Par Villa
 Pasir Panjang

Bus 
There are 3 bus terminals within the planning area. Buona Vista Bus Terminal is located along Holland Drive while Ghim Moh Bus Terminal is located along Ghim Moh Road. Both of which are near to the Buona Vista MRT Station. Kent Ridge Bus Terminal is located within the vicinity of the Kent Ridge campus of the National University of Singapore, at the western portion of the planning area.

All three bus terminals within the planning area are anchored by Clementi Bus Package under Bus Contracting Model.

Roads 
Queenstown planning area is connected by road to the rest of Singapore via the Ayer Rajah Expressway, a major expressway connecting western Singapore to the Central Area, and also to Johor via the Tuas Second Link. Major roads in the planning area include Queensway, which is part of the Outer Ring Road System (ORRS), a semi-expressway, together with Portsdown Avenue. Queensway intersects with Commonwealth Avenue, a major road that parallels the East West Line and continues into Commonwealth Avenue West at Buona Vista. At the southern portion, the West Coast Highway is a major arterial road that links the district of Pasir Panjang to the Jurong Industrial Estate to the west and the Central Area to the east. At the eastern border with Bukit Merah, Alexandra Road is a major road that connects Pasir Panjang Road with Ayer Rajah Expressway, Queensway and Commonwealth Avenue.

Education
Queenstown Planning Area is home to various schools and prominent educational institutions such as the main campus of the National University of Singapore.

Primary schools 
 Fairfield Methodist School (Primary)
 New Town Primary School
 Queenstown Primary School

Secondary schools 
 Anglo-Chinese School (Independent)
 Fairfield Methodist School (Secondary)
 New Town Secondary School
 Queenstown Secondary School
 Queensway Secondary School
School of Science and Technology, Singapore

Tertiary Institutions 
 Anglo-Chinese Junior College
 MDIS UniCampus
 National University of Singapore (Main Campus)
 Singapore Institute of Technology (Main Campus) 
 Singapore Polytechnic

Other schools 
 Anglo-Chinese School (International)
 Dover Court International School
 ESSEC Business School 
 Global Indian International School (GIIS), Queenstown Campus
 INSEAD Asia
 Rainbow Centre
 Tanglin Trust School
 United World College of South East Asia

Other amenities

Other places in Queenstown include
 Alexandra Hospital
 Anchorpoint Shopping Centre 
 Buona Vista Community Club
 Dover Community Centre
 Dawson Place
 Haw Par Villa
 HortPark
 IKEA Alexandra
 Kent Ridge Park
 National University Hospital (Kent Ridge)
 National University Polyclinic (Queenstown)
 Park Hotel Alexandra
 Tiong Ghee Temple
 Hang Jebat Mosque
 Queenstown Community Centre 
 Queenstown Fire Station
 Queenstown Neighbourhood Police Centre
 Queenstown Public Library
 Queensway Shopping Centre
 The Star Vista
 Ulu Pandan Community Club
 Dover Parkview
 Heritage View 
 Holland Grove
 Glentrees
 Parvis
 Holland Peak
 Wessex Estate
 The Anchorage

See also

My Queenstown Heritage Trail

Notes

References 

 
1950s establishments in Singapore
Places in Singapore
Central Region, Singapore
New towns started in the 1950s